The Moskvitch 402 is a compact car manufactured by the former Soviet automobile maker MZMA, first time introduced in 1956 as a second generation of the Moskvitch series. In comparison with its predecessor, the Moskvitch-401, the M-402 model featured many improvements which included independent suspension with double wishbones, telescopic shock absorbers, 12-volt electrics, more solid and comfortable car body, more modern trunk, heater, standard car radio, wider viewing range for the driver, etc.

Design
The styling of the Moskvitch-402 followed the fashion set by similar-sized cars of its time such as the Hillman Minx, FIAT 1100, Ford Prefect 100E, Jowett Javelin, and Ford Consul Mk1, as well as by the larger GAZ-21 Volga, whose designers took part in the creation of this car.
The M-402 was the first Moskvitch designed in the Soviet Union and not based on any foreign model. At  overall, it was  longer than the 401. Though the gearchange had moved to the steering column, the gearbox was the same three-speed manual. Electrics changed from six volt to twelve, a change already being made in the United States. Radio, cigarette lighter, and demister were standard, at a time when the demister was not so in the United Kingdom.

The estate (402-423) appeared in 1957, with folding rear seats and a  payload. Proposed three-door and sedan delivery models were not produced.

Exported to several Western countries, the M-402 in Norway had an advantage over the Ford Anglia or Prefect, being both more available and less subject to import duty.

Limited production of four-wheel drive variants of the M-402 (the M-410 saloon) was built in 1957-1958, using transfer case and axles of the GAZ-69 and Pobeda steering.

The final Moskvitch-402 was produced in July 1957; there were 94,080 in all (including 18,019 for export).

M-407
With the new M-407-series   overhead valve engine, in 1958, the M-402 became the Moskvitch-407. A four-speed transmission with synchromesh appeared in December 1959, in place of the three-speed.

Also, there was a more powerful version of 407, delivering 67 hp, that could reach up to 145 km/h, reaching 100 km/h in about 19 seconds. This model was only for the soviet Police and KGB, not for sales to public. These performances were about the same with the M-412, launched about 8 years later. Some were sold to public when withdrawn from regular Police service. 

The M-407 was offered as an estate (407-423N), delivery (407-430), medical team model (407B), and taxi (407T). The delivery simply had the rear windows of the estate not cut out and the rear doors welded shut; it was only available to official groups.

A M-407 came third in class at the 1000 Lakes Rally in 1957.

Like the M-402, there were four-wheel drive M-407s, too, beginning with the M-407-410N in June 1958 and the M-407-411N estate in August. At first, these had the three-speed, changing to the four-speed in 1960. A total of 11,890 four-wheel drive 402s and 407s were built by the end of production in January 1961, a result of Moskvitch being unable to keep up with demand for its mainstream M-407s.

In 1961, the M-407 was further upgraded with an even more powerful M-407D1-D2 engine (allowing to handle the fourth speed on a manual transmission), self-adjusting brake cylinders and hydraulic clutch drive, improved front suspension for easier driving, and a completely restructured dashboard. This model, manufactured as the Moskvitch 403, served as a transition between the second and the third generation Moskvitches, debuting in 1964, with the mechanical components of the Moskvitch 408 (which had not yet appeared) and the body of the M-402. The M-403E and M-403IE were intended for export. In 1963, an estate variant, the 424, appeared (with the 424E the export model). The M-403 lasted only until July 1965, with 133,523 cars built (50,612 for export).

The M-402 was discontinued by August 1959, with the M-407 production ending in October 1963 (with 359,980 built, 120,903 for export).

The M-407 was the first Soviet automotive export to be truly successful in the West. Up to half of all M-407 production was exported for a number of years, mainly to the Eastern Bloc countries, Norway, Finland, and France. In parts of Western Europe, it was rebranded the Elite, to avoid conflict with Peugeot, which had trademarked names with middle "0"s. A large number of the cars sold in Western Europe were assembled by Sobimpex (known as Scaldia from 1965) in Seneffe, Belgium. Owned by a Romanian-born Belgian, Joseph Beherman, Scaldia was the first to assemble Soviet automobiles within the EEC. The cars received Belgian tires, while Deluxe models were fitted with European-made interiors and chrome brightwork. Test production began in 1962, with full series production commencing in March 1964. Production was of the M-407 and M-423, even though the newer M-403 had arrived in some markets.

The Moskvitch-402 and 407 could be considered as the first step in Soviet and Russian automotive history towards producing customer-adapted trim levels for various uses. While the M-407 provided greater driving comfort at bigger expenses, other trim levels included the M-407-424 station wagon available for the general public, M-431 delivery pick-up/ambulance van and even the 410/411 attempt of creating an SUV-based sedan/station wagon.

Trims and body styles

 Moskvitch 402 — the original series, produced from 1956 to 1958.
 Moskvitch 402B – version of 402 for disabled persons
 Moskvitch 402M – medical transport version of 402
 Moskvitch 402T – taxicab version of 402
 Moskvitch 410 — first Soviet crossover, briefly produced between 1957 and 1958. Based on the 402.
 Moskvitch 423 — second generation station wagon (after Moskvitch 422-422K), produced between 1957 and 1958.
 Moskvitch A9 — a 402-based minivan prototype, produced in 1957.
 Moskvitch 429 — a delivery pick-up prototype based on the 402, cancelled in favor of the 430.
 Moskvitch 407 — same series with modified engine and frontal grille, produced from 1958 to 1964.
 Moskvitch 407B – version of 407 for disabled persons
 Moskvitch 407M – medical transport version of 407
 Moskvitch 407T – taxicab version of 407
 Moskvitch 410N — upgraded 410 with 407 engine, produced from 1958 to 1961.
 Moskvitch 411 — a station wagon crossover, created by combining the 423 body with the 410N chassis, produced from 1959 to 1961.
 Moskvitch 423N — upgraded version of 423 with 407 engine, produced 1958 through 1963.
 Moskvitch 423Yu – version of 423N for warmer climates
 Moskvitch 423Ye – export version of 423N
 Moskvitch 430 – two-door panel van version of 423N. Produced from 1958.
 Moskvitch 431 – prototype crossover version of 430. Produced in 1960.
 Moskvitch 403 — improved version of the 407, with notable interior accommodations. Produced from 1961 to 1965.
 Moskvitch 403B – version of 403 for disabled persons
 Moskvitch 403M – medical transport version of 403
 Moskvitch 403T – taxicab version of 403
 Moskvitch 403E — export version of the 403, produced from 1962 to 1965.
 Moskvitch 424 — the 423 model redesigned to feature a convertible passengers/cargo rear compartment, possible unification of 423 and 430 models released from 1963 to 1965.
 Moskvitch 424Yu – version of 424 for warmer climates
 Moskvitch 424Ye – export version of 424, produced from 1962 to 1965.
 Moskvitch 424E – station wagon version of 424 for export.
 Moskvitch 432 — panel van version of 403
 Moskvitch 432E – export version of 432
 Moskvitch 407 coupe (Moskvitch 409) — a 407-based sports car, produced in 1962.

Notes

Sources 
 Thompson, Andy. Cars of the Soviet Union. Somerset, UK: Haynes Publishing,  2008.
 Flory, J. "Kelly", Jr. American Cars 1946-1959. Jefferson, NC:  McFarland & Coy, 2008.

Cars of Russia
402
Compact cars
Sedans
Station wagons
Rear-wheel-drive vehicles
Soviet automobiles
1960s cars
Cars introduced in 1958